Sahyadri Science College is a government institute located in the Shivamogga district of Karnataka. The college is a constituent body of the Kuvempu University, Shivamogga.

Alumni

The Alumni of the school include U. R. Ananthamurthy, Poornachandra Tejaswi, D.H.Shankaramurthy, K.V. Subbanna and C.N.R. Rao. Shri. K.V. Subbanna, an eminent theatre personality and winner of the Magsaysay Award.

Former teachers

Padmashri K. S. Nissar Ahmed taught in the college for two terms during 1967–72 and 1975–78.

Dr. C.N.R. Rao Auditorium 

Eminent scientist and Bharat Ratna C.N.R. Rao studied here during 1947 to 1949 for his Intermediate course. In honour of his contribution and service to the nation, the college dedicated an auditorium in the name of him.  During the year 2006, Dr. Rao visited Sahyadri Science College and addressed the students and staff.  In his talk, Dr. Rao strongly advised the students to evince more interest in scientific research.

References 

Education in Shimoga
Universities and colleges in Shimoga district